Pterostylis recurva commonly known as the jug orchid, recurved shell orchid, antelope orchid or bull orchid, is a plant in the orchid family Orchidaceae and is endemic to the south-west of Western Australia. It is a relatively common orchid which has up to four jug-shaped or funnel-shaped white flowers with green and brown lines and markings. Non-flowering plants have a rosette of leaves on a short stalk.

Description
Pterostylis recurva, is a terrestrial,  perennial, deciduous, herb with an underground tuber. The labellum is reddish, insect-like and held inside the flower except for its tip. Flowering occurs from August to October.

Taxonomy and naming
Pterostylis recurva was first formally described in 1873 by George Bentham and the description was published in Flora Australiensis. The specific epithet (recurva) is a Latin word meaning "bent backward" referring to the downcurved lateral sepals.

Distribution and habitat
The jug orchid is found in woodland, shrubland, forest and in shallow soil on granite outcrops. It grows in sand, clay, laterite and gravel soils and is common and widespread between Geraldton and Israelite Bay.

Conservation
Pterostylis recurva is classified as "not threatened" by the Western Australian Government Department of Parks and Wildlife.

References

recurva
Endemic orchids of Australia
Orchids of Western Australia
Plants described in 1873